Zəylik or Zagllik or Zaghk or Dzaglik may refer to:
 Zəylik, Dashkasan, Azerbaijan
 Zəylik, Kalbajar, Azerbaijan
 Zaglik, Nagorno-Karabakh, also known as Zəylik, a village in the self-proclaimed Republic of Artsakh, de jure in Azerbaijan, in the disputed region of Nagorno-Karabakh
 Zaglik-e Kurbolagh, Iran
 Zaglik-e Olya, Iran
 Zaglik-e Sofla, Iran